Enakhe is an Africa Magic original crime drama set in modern-day Benin City. It was directed by Victor Sanchez Aghahowa and features Alex Usifo, Ivie Okujaye, Philip Asaya, Lancelot Oduwa Imaseun and Lota Chukwu. It premiered on September 28, 2020 and airs on Africa Magic Showcase, DStv channel 151.  It also streams on Showmax, at the same time as the broadcast on Africa Magic.

Plot summary 
Set in modern-day Benin city, Enakhe tells the story of Epa Iwinosa, father of the Eponymous character and the leader of “the association of friends” also known as “the table”, a small brotherhood that rules the underworld in Benin. Epa moved to crime after his friend's child died due to a lack of funds. It also tells the story of Enakhe who is kind, unassuming and ignorant of her father's dealings. Enakhe is unfit for a life of crime but in spite of this, she is destined to rule after Epa who is unexpectedly killed. Enakhe grows to know about her father's dealings and is forced out of her shell to embrace her father's ruthlessness and fearlessness.

Cast and characters

Main Characters 
Alex Usifo as Osasere ‘Epa’ Iwinosa, the patriarch of the Iwinosa family and leader of ‘The table’ of friends.

Lancelot Odua Imasuen as Chief Sir Ehigiator Osagie, a lily-livered man who isn't in control of his business or his household. Epa's criminal ally and member of the table.

Ivie Okujaye as Enakhe Iwinosa, the eponymous star of the show. She struggles to find her feet in the crime world  following her father's death.

Tolu Odewunmi as Latifah Iwinosa, Enakhe's mother and Epa's second wife. Latifah is insecure because she did not bear Epa an heir and therefore has no place on the table.

Benjamin Olaye Jnr as Archie Umweni, Enakhe's narcissistic, entitled, self-absorbed and condescending fiancé who is a disappointment to his father.

Angela Eguaveon as Ivie Osakpolor, Enakhe's best friend and adopted daughter of the Iwinosas who doubles as Archie's secret lover.

Charles Etubiebi as Jonas Osagie, Chief Osagie's heir and Enakhe's love interest. He often comes off as being naive and too relaxed.

Sammi Edehi Egbadon as Onanefe Efetobore, California's cousin who was raised with the sole purpose of bringing down the Iwinosa family. He however starts to question his mother's single-minded purpose and seek his own path.

Lota Chukwu as Jacinta Osagie, Unlike her brother, Jacinta knows the crime business and takes charge of her family's stake. She isn't afraid of getting her hands dirty.

Philip Asaya as California 'Cali' Osasere Iwinosa, He is Epa's first born. Cali's endearing love for his family and his quest to make sure they remain safe and also at the top of the crime business, brings him on a stormy side of life to sail on. 
 
Ekhaguere Patience as Regina, She is the wife to Stone and baby mama to Epa. Regina is the accountant to the family's company. She transitions from being a soft naive chic to the complete opposite.

Kate Adepegba as Margaret Osagie

Eunice Omoregie as Ejiro/Ejiro

Efosa Adams as Stone Iwinosa

William Goldwyn Omo as Chief Umweni

Odera Olivia Orji as Tamuno ‘Tamtam’ Timipreye
Nengi Adoki as General Market 'GM'

Production and release 
Enakhe was set on location in Benin City, Edo State. It is a product of the Edo Creative Hub which was created to streamline engagements with the state's creative industry. The cast and crew is approximately 90 percent indigenous.

It was listed as one of the top 5 Nigerian TV series of 2020.

Awards and nominations

See also 

 Africa Magic
 Ivie Okujaye
 Lota Chukwu
 Philip Asaya

References 

Nigerian television soap operas
English-language television shows
2020 Nigerian television series debuts
2021 Nigerian television series endings
Africa Magic original programming